DNA repair protein REV1 is a protein that in humans is encoded by the REV1 gene. 

This gene encodes a protein with similarity to the S. cerevisiae mutagenesis protein Rev1. The Rev1 proteins contain a BRCT domain, which is important in protein-protein interactions. A suggested role for the human Rev1-like protein is as a scaffold that recruits DNA polymerases involved in translesion synthesis (TLS) of damaged DNA. Two alternatively spliced transcript variants that encode different proteins have been found.

Rev1 is a Y family DNA polymerase; it is sometimes referred to as a deoxycytidyl transferase because it only inserts deoxycytidine (dC) across from lesions. Whether G, A, T, C, or an abasic site, Rev1 will always add a C. Rev1 has the ability to always add a C, because it uses an arginine as a template which complements well with C. Yet it is believed that Rev1 rarely uses its polymerase activity; rather it is thought that Rev1's primary role is as a protein landing pad, whereby it helps direct the recruitment of TLS proteins, especially Pol ζ (Rev3/Rev7).

Interactions
REV1 has been shown to interact with MAD2L2. It is believed that Rev1 may interact with PCNA, once ubiquitylated due to a lesion, and help recruit Pol ζ (Rev3/Rev7) a B family polymerase involved in TLS.

References

Further reading